The 2001 Portland Timbers season was the inaugural season for the Portland Timbers—the 3rd incarnation of a club to bear the Timbers name—of the now-defunct A-League, the second-tier league of the United States and Canada at the time.

Regular season

April

May

June

July

August

September

Postseason

Competitions

A-League

Western Conference standings

Point system: 4 points for a win; 1 point for a draw; 1 point for scoring 3 or more goals in a game; 0 points for a loss

Results by round

A-League Playoffs

Playoff bracket

First round

Quarterfinals

U.S. Open Cup

Qualification Group 9 standings

Point system: 4 points for a win; 1 point for a draw; 1 point for scoring 3 or more goals in a game; 0 points for a loss

Club 
<div style="float:left; width:47%;">

Coaching staff

Top scorers
Players with 1 goal or more included only.

Disciplinary record 
Players with 1 card or more included only.

Goalkeeper stats 
All goalkeepers included.

Player movement

Transfers in

Loans in

Transfers out

Loans out

Notes
 Disciplinary record not available for the following games: May 5 vs. Utah Blitzz (U.S. Open Cup qualification), May 6 vs. Northern Nevada Aces (U.S. Open Cup qualification), July 15 vs. Vancouver Whitecaps (A-League regular season), August 5 vs. Rochester Raging Rhinos (A-League regular season) and September 22 vs. Charlotte Eagles (A-League playoffs).
 Goalkeeper saves not available for the following games: September 22 vs. Charlotte Eagles (A-League playoffs) and September 29 vs. Hershey Wildcats (A-League playoffs).

References

2001 in Portland, Oregon
2001
American soccer clubs 2001 season
2001 in sports in Oregon